Émile Henriot may refer to:

 Émile Henriot (writer) (1889–1961), French poet, novelist, essayist and literary critic
 Émile Henriot (chemist) (1885–1961), French chemist

See also
 Henriot (disambiguation)